James Hamilton, 5th Duke of Abercorn,  (born 4 July 1934), styled Viscount Strabane until 1953 and Marquess of Hamilton between 1953 and 1979, is a British peer, courtier and politician.

He became the 5th Duke of Abercorn in the Peerage of Ireland on the death of his father, the 4th Duke, in 1979.  He was an Ulster Unionist politician and served as Member of Parliament for Fermanagh and South Tyrone. He later served as Lord Steward of the Household to Elizabeth II. He has been Chancellor of the Order of the Garter since 2012.

Early life and family
He was born on 4 July 1934 to James Hamilton, Marquess of Hamilton, and The Hon. Kathleen Crichton. From birth, he held the courtesy title Viscount Strabane, until the death of his paternal grandfather, the 3rd Duke of Abercorn, in 1953, when he became Marquess of Hamilton, the title he held until the death of his father.

On 20 October 1966, the then Lord Hamilton married Alexandra Phillips, daughter of Lieutenant Colonel Harold Phillips and Georgina Wernher, herself the elder daughter and co-heiress of Sir Harold Wernher, 3rd Baronet, of Luton Hoo, Bedfordshire. Their wedding at Westminster Abbey was attended by members of the royal family, including Elizabeth II and the Queen Mother, and Prince Andrew was a pageboy.

The Duke and Duchess of Abercorn had three children:

 James Harold Charles Hamilton, Marquess of Hamilton (born 19 August 1969); a godson of King Charles III; married Tanya Marie Nation on 7 May 2004, had issue:
 James Alfred Nicholas Hamilton, Viscount Strabane (born 30 October 2005)
 Lord Claud Douglas Harold Hamilton (born 12 December 2007)
 Lady Sophia Alexandra Hamilton (born 8 June 1973); married Anthony Loyd on 7 September 2002, divorced 2005, no issue 
 Lord Nicholas Edward Hamilton (born 5 July 1979); married Tatiana Kronberg on 30 August 2009, had issue

The Duke was a first cousin of the 8th Earl Spencer, father of Diana, Princess of Wales. He attended Diana's 1981 wedding to Prince Charles at St Paul's Cathedral.

Career
Educated at Eton College and the Royal Agricultural College, in 1953 he was commissioned into the Grenadier Guards as Second Lieutenant Lord James Paisley, and then promoted to Lieutenant in 1955. He quit active service and was absorbed into the Regular Reserves a year later. In 1964 he became Ulster Unionist MP for Fermanagh and South Tyrone, succeeding his cousin, Lord Robert Grosvenor. He held his seat in the 1966 election but lost it to Frank McManus in 1970 by 1,423 votes. In 1970 he served as High Sheriff of Tyrone. In 1974 he joined the Ulster Defence Regiment, but left the regiment and remained in the British Army in the Volunteer List in 1980. From 1986 to 2009 he was the Lord Lieutenant of County Tyrone. In 1999, he was appointed a Knight of the Order of the Garter. He was Colonel of the Irish Guards from 2000 to 2008. Additionally, he was appointed Lord Steward of the Household in 2001, serving until 2009.

His seat is Baronscourt, near Newtownstewart, County Tyrone, Northern Ireland. The Dukedom of Abercorn is in the Peerage of Ireland and did not carry an entitlement to a seat in the House of Lords, but until 1999 the Duke was entitled to sit there under his subsidiary title Marquess of Abercorn, in the Peerage of Great Britain. He was appointed Chancellor of the Order of the Garter on 17 October 2012.

In 1987, he served as a judge in Prince Edward's charity television special The Grand Knockout Tournament.

Arms

References

 "Burke's Peerage and Baronetage"
 http://www.recyclegen.com/archives/montg_coll/def/evans.htm 
 http://www.exeter-cathedral.org.uk/_assets/mary%20jane%20nation.pdf 
 http://www.nationstudy.com/getperson.php?personID=I8941&tree=NationStudy

External links

 

1934 births
Alumni of the Royal Agricultural University
Grenadier Guards officers
105
Knights of the Garter
Living people
High Sheriffs of Tyrone
Lord-Lieutenants of Tyrone
Members of the Parliament of the United Kingdom for Fermanagh and South Tyrone (since 1950)
People educated at Eton College
People from County Tyrone
Ulster Unionist Party members of the House of Commons of the United Kingdom
Hamilton, Marquess of
Hamilton, Marquess of
UK MPs who inherited peerages
Chancellors of the Order of the Garter
Abercorn